The Vilvoorde viaduct is part of the  R0 Brussels beltway.

Built as the last piece to close the Brussels beltway in 1977, it allowed the beltway to be opened for traffic on December 29 the same year. It crosses several roads, the river Zenne, the Brussels–Scheldt Maritime Canal, a railroad and the (then) Renault factory.

Today's daily traffic is about 140.000 vehicles, while the saturation point is about 180.000.

Technical data
Length : 1700 m 
Height : 35 m (average) 
Width : 20 m for each direction 
22 rows of pillars
Largest span: 162 m
Superstructure : start and ending in concrete - centre structure in steel (879 m)

Viaducts
Bridges completed in 1977
Bridges in Belgium
Buildings and structures in Flemish Brabant
Vilvoorde